Eva Catherine Ault (11 October 1891–1984) was a Canadian woman ice hockey player. Known as "Queen of the Ice", Ault is credited with helping to popularize women's ice hockey during the early 20th century.

She was born in Aultsville, Ontario, grew up in Finch, Ontario and later moved to Ottawa with her family. She joined the Ottawa Alerts, a team formed in 1915; its members came from the Ottawa Ladies' College and the local YWCA. In 1916, the Alerts defeated the Pittsburgh Ladies Club three times in one day and then defeated the Toronto club the following day. The Alerts were defeated in the Canadian championship later that year, losing to the Cornwall Victorias. The Alerts did defeated the Pittsburgh Polar Maids in 1917 to become world champions. The team also won the Canadian championship in the 1922/1923 season.

She served as vice-president of the Ladies Ontario Hockey Association in 1924 and 1925. After retiring from hockey, Ault volunteered with the Minto Skating Club.

She married James Buels, who played for the Ottawa Rough Riders football team.

Ault died in 1984 at the age of 93 and was buried in Beechwood Cemetery.

Ault's story was featured in an episode of the CBC television documentary Hockey: A People's History.

References 

1891 births
1984 deaths
Canadian women's ice hockey players
Ice hockey people from Ontario
People from the United Counties of Stormont, Dundas and Glengarry